Robin White, MBE (born 1944), was for many years editor of the BBC's programmes Focus on Africa and Network Africa which are broadcast on the BBC African Service. He is well known for his interviews with politicians, which have included Charles Taylor, Foday Sankoh, Margaret Thatcher, Milton Obote, Olusegun Obasanjo, Yoweri Museveni, Sam Nujoma, Kenneth Kaunda, and Thabo Mbeki.

Biography
Born in 1944 in Nottingham, White took a placement in Cameroon with VSO after graduating from Cambridge. He joined the BBC in the late 1960s.  Apart from his work as a journalist on African affairs, he has worked in educational broadcasting and on the British domestic culture and arts programme, Kaleidoscope. He is also a published playwright, with work broadcast by the BBC.  Robin is married to Mary Catherine Restieaux, a textile weaving artist whose work has been exhibited at The Victoria & Albert Museum.

In 2000 he was awarded an MBE for his outstanding contribution to the BBC World Service.

References 

1944 births
Living people
African journalism
English Africanists
BBC newsreaders and journalists
BBC World Service presenters
Foreign correspondents in Africa
Members of the Order of the British Empire